Roland Johansson (19 July 1930 – 24 April 2005) was a Swedish boxer. He competed in the men's flyweight event at the 1952 Summer Olympics.

References

External links
 

1930 births
2005 deaths
Swedish male boxers
Olympic boxers of Sweden
Boxers at the 1952 Summer Olympics
Sportspeople from Halmstad
Flyweight boxers
Sportspeople from Halland County
20th-century Swedish people